Xanthodisca rega, the yellow-disk skipper, is a butterfly in the family Hesperiidae. It is found in Senegal, Guinea-Bissau, Guinea, Sierra Leone, Liberia, Ivory Coast, Ghana, Nigeria, Cameroon and Gabon. The habitat consists of wet and dry forests and secondary growth.

The larvae feed on Aframomum sceptrum.

References

Erionotini
Butterflies of Africa
Lepidoptera of West Africa
Butterflies described in 1890